Dionysius O'Driscoll, O.F.M. Obs. or Dionysius Odriscol (died 1650) was a Roman Catholic prelate who served as Archbishop of Brindisi (1640–1650).

Biography
Dionysius O'Driscoll was born in Ireland and ordained a priest in the Order of Friars Minor Observant.
On 5 Mar 1640, he was appointed during the papacy of Pope Urban VIII as Archbishop of Brindisi.
On 9 Apr 1640, he was consecrated bishop by Gil Carrillo de Albornoz, Cardinal-Priest of Santa Maria in Via, with Vincenzo Napoli, Bishop of Patti, and Deodato Scaglia, Bishop of Melfi e Rapolla, serving as co-consecrators. 
He served as Archbishop of Brindisi until his death in Aug 1650.

References

External links and additional sources
 (for Chronology of Bishops) 
 (for Chronology of Bishops)  

17th-century Italian Roman Catholic archbishops
Bishops appointed by Pope Urban VIII
1650 deaths
Irish Franciscans
Observant Franciscan bishops